Julie Hosch (born December 7, 1939) was an American farmer and politician.

Born in Manchester, Iowa, Hosch went to Kirkwood and Northeast Iowa Community Colleges. Hosch was a farmer and cattle dealer in Cascade, Iowa. From 2003 to 2005, Hosch served in the Iowa State Senate and was a Republican.

Notes

1939 births
Living people
People from Cascade, Iowa
People from Manchester, Iowa
Kirkwood Community College alumni
Farmers from Iowa
Women state legislators in Iowa
Republican Party Iowa state senators
21st-century American women